Wakasugiyama Toyoichi (born Toyoichi Kumamoto; January 24, 1933 – November 4, 1999) was a sumo wrestler from Shime, Fukuoka, Japan. He made his professional debut in March 1953, and reached the top division in March 1959. His highest rank was maegashira 1. He left the sumo world upon retirement from active competition in May 1967.

Career record
The Kyushu tournament was first held in 1957, and the Nagoya tournament in 1958.

See also
Glossary of sumo terms
List of past sumo wrestlers
List of sumo tournament top division runners-up
List of sumo tournament second division champions

References

1933 births
Japanese sumo wrestlers
Sumo people from Fukuoka Prefecture
1999 deaths